Zoran Perisic (born March 16, 1940) is a Serbian-American visual effects artist. He was nominated for an Academy Award in the category Best Visual Effects for the film Return to Oz. Perisic also won the Academy Award for Technical Achievement for the film Superman.

Selected filmography 
 Superman (1978; co-won the Academy Award for Technical Achievement with Les Bowie, Colin Chilvers, Denys Coop, Roy Field and Derek Meddings)
 Return to Oz (1985; co-nominated with Will Vinton, Ian Wingrove and Michael Lloyd)

References

External links 

1940 births
Living people
Place of birth missing (living people)
Visual effects artists
Visual effects supervisors
Academy Award for Technical Achievement winners